Ryan Adam Stone (born March 20, 1985) is a Canadian former professional ice hockey centre who most recently played for Hamburg Freezers of the Deutsche Eishockey Liga.

Playing career

Early career
Stone was drafted 23rd overall in the 2000 Western Hockey League (WHL) draft by the Brandon Wheat Kings. During his time with the Wheat Kings, Stone compiled 78 goals and 162 assists in 239 regular-season games. In 2004, he earned a scholarship to Brandon University and was named to Team Canada's Junior selection camp.

Stone was drafted in the second round, 32nd overall, by the Pittsburgh Penguins in the 2003 NHL Entry Draft.  He was later drafted 48th overall in the World Hockey Association Draft. In his last year in the WHL, Stone was named Canadian Hockey League Player of the Week after he recorded six goals and 12 points in four games. He ended his final junior season recording 66 assists, a league best, and 127 penalty minutes.

Professional career

After attending the Penguins training camp, Stone was reassigned to their American Hockey League (AHL) affiliate, the Wilkes-Barre/Scranton Penguins to begin the 2007–08 season. Stone made his NHL debut on January 10, 2008, against the Tampa Bay Lightning and recorded his first NHL point on March 12, 2008, against the Buffalo Sabres. In April 2008, Stone was charged and held in custody for public drunkenness, which was dealt with internally by the Wilkes-Barre/Scranton Penguins staff. At the end of the season, Stone was re-signed by the Penguins to another one-year deal.

On January 17, 2009, he was traded by Pittsburgh along with Dany Sabourin and a 4th round pick to the Edmonton Oilers for Mathieu Garon. Stone was subsequently signed to a one-year, two-way contract with the Oilers on August 12, 2009.

On July 7, 2010, he signed a one-year deal with the Calgary Flames, though played that season with their farm club, the Abbotsford Heat. The next year, he signed a contract with HC TPS of the Finnish Liiga. After playing half a season with TPS, Stone signed with the Hamburg Freezers of the Deutsche Eishockey Liga.

Awards and achievements
2004–05 -WHL  East First All-Star Team

Career statistics

Regular season and playoffs

References

External links
 

1985 births
Living people
Abbotsford Heat players
Brandon Wheat Kings players
Canadian ice hockey centres
Edmonton Oilers players
Hamburg Freezers players
HC TPS players
Pittsburgh Penguins draft picks
Pittsburgh Penguins players
Ice hockey people from Calgary
Springfield Falcons players
Wilkes-Barre/Scranton Penguins players